Grafton Railway Station is a station serving the inner-city suburb of Grafton in Auckland, New Zealand. It is located on the Western Line of Auckland's passenger rail network and consists of an island platform located in a trench near the intersection of Khyber Pass Road and Park Road. The station opened on 11 April 2010.

Connectivity and layout
The station serves as a direct interchange with a large number of bus routes, including the InnerLink and buses travelling along the Central Connector, and is located in close proximity to Auckland Hospital, Auckland Domain and the University of Auckland's Grafton and Newmarket campuses.

The station has four entrances, as its platform extends under both Khyber Pass Road and Park Road, with stairs connecting the station to both sides of each road. Both of the Park Road stairs connect directly to bus stops. There is also a lift on the western side of Park Road. The entrance on the southern side of Khyber Pass Road is adjacent to St Peter's College and students have direct access to the platform without having to cross any roads. Up to a third of the school's students use Grafton station in the mornings and afternoons on school days.

Services
Auckland One Rail, on behalf of Auckland Transport, operates Western Line services to Britomart and Swanson. The off-peak weekday frequencies are:
3 trains per hour (tph) to Britomart
3 tph to Swanson

Bus routes 30, 70, 75, 295, 309, 321 and the Inner Link serve Grafton station.

Future
When the City Rail Link opens in late 2024, rail services at Grafton Station will change significantly. The Western Line will no longer serve the station, as it will be rerouted through the new tunnels between Mount Eden and Britomart. Instead, the Southern Line will be rerouted through Grafton on its way between Newmarket and the City Centre, and a new Crosstown Line will also serve the station as part of its route between Henderson and Otahuhu.

History
Grafton Station replaced Boston Road station, and is located approximately 300m north-east of the site of the former station. The station was re-sited at a cost of $3 million to make it closer to major destinations such as the hospital and to allow more direct interchange to bus routes than the previous site. The line through the station was electrified in 2014, and AM class EMUs replaced diesel powered trains on the Western Line in 2015.

See also 
 List of Auckland railway stations
 Public transport in Auckland

References 

Rail transport in Auckland
Railway stations in New Zealand
Railway stations opened in 2010
2010 establishments in New Zealand
Buildings and structures in Auckland